The Gepiu is a river in Bihor County, Romania. Its source is near Șauaieu. Near Inand it discharges into the Corhana. Various reaches of the river are known under different names such as Pruniște River, Valea Cireșului River, Calaboj River, Sămăroaga River or Rădăoli River.

References

Rivers of Romania
Rivers of Bihor County